The Municipality of Darlington was a local government area of Sydney, New South Wales, Australia. The municipality was proclaimed in 1864 and, with an area of 0.2 square kilometres, was the smallest municipal council in Sydney. It included the entire suburb of Darlington, excepting a small block between Golden Grove and Forbes streets, which was administered by the Municipality of Redfern in Golden Grove Ward. The council was amalgamated, along with most of its neighbours, with the City of Sydney to the north with the passing of the Local Government (Areas) Act 1948. From 1968 to 1982 and from 1989 to 2004, the area was part of the South Sydney councils.

Council history
In 1842 Cleveland Street, Sydney was gazetted as the boundary road for the Sydney Municipality and by 1864 residents south of the street had petitioned to become part of the Sydney Council area. When their request was rejected, 104 residents of the Darlington area submitted a further petition to the Governor, Sir John Young, which asked for the establishment of a new municipality south of Cleveland Street. The Governor declared the establishment of the Municipality on 11 August 1864, which was published in the NSW Government Gazette five days later. The first meeting of the electors occurred on 16 September 1864, with Charles Muzio Deane elected as the first Chairman and Aaron Loveridge, Thomas Shepherd, Robert Maze, John Williams and Frederick Williams as Aldermen. George Pile became the first Town Clerk. Under the enactment of the Municipalities Act, 1867, the title of "Chairman" for the council was changed to be "Mayor" and the council was renamed as the Borough of Darlington'''. From 28 December 1906, following the passing of the Local Government Act, 1906'', the council was again renamed as the "Municipality of Darlington".

The municipality was characterised by stable, and, for the most part, non-partisan, councils, which was often in direct contrast to its neighbours: Redfern and Newtown were often divided, especially over choosing a mayor, and Camperdown Council had declared insolvency and was absorbed into Sydney City Council in 1908. Darlington had many long-serving mayors and aldermen, such as Alderman William Graham (1849–1933), who served on the council from 1887 to his death in May 1933, a record total of 47 years service which included four terms as mayor. The boundaries of Darlington Council were expanded due to a transfer with Camperdown in 1906, bringing the boundary of the council up to Newtown Road. Further minor boundary transfers were made with Redfern in 1920 and Sydney in 1931.

By the end of the Second World War, the NSW Government had realised that its ideas of infrastructure expansion could not be realised by the present system of the mostly-poor inner-city municipal councils and the Minister for Local Government, Joseph Cahill, pushed through a bill in 1948 that abolished a significant number of those councils. Darlington was abolished and amalgamated with the City of Sydney following the enactment of the Local Government (Areas) Act 1948, which came into effect from 1 January 1949. The former council area subsequently became part of the South Sydney Municipality from 1968 to 1982 and from 1988 to 1992.

Mayors

Town Clerks

Town Hall

The council first met in Harris' School in Rose Street, Darlington, before moving to other premises on the same street, which were occupied until 1 August 1878, when it was decided to build a Town Hall on a site on Darlington Road. This site, with the Darlington Public School situated next door, was first used from 2 January 1879. With the sacrifice of many Darlington residents in the First World War, the council commissioned a Roll of Honour for the Town Hall, which was unveiled by Mayor A. S. Elvy on 16 March 1918.

A Memorial Tablet commemorating the former Darlington resident and Victoria Cross recipient, Captain Alfred Shout, was made by Anthony Hordern and unveiled on 20 November 1915 by the Governor General Sir Ronald Munro Ferguson at the Town Hall. With the completion of a new facade for the Town Hall, the tablet was inset into the front of the building completed in 1925. It is now displayed at Victoria Barracks Museum, Paddington. The Town Hall was expanded in 1925 and included the erection of a social hall.

The Town Hall was acquired by the University of Sydney in 1961 as part of its significant expansion to the south, which included a large part of Darlington. The Hall continued to operate as a social hall and venue until its closure in 1972 and was demolished in 1975 along with 650 houses and other Darlington buildings in controversial expansions undertaken by the university that reduced the population of the suburb by 2,000.

See also
 Nicholas Hawken, Darlington Alderman for 15 years, Mayor (1881–1883), Member of Parliament for Newtown (1887–1891), MLC (1899–1908).

References

1864 establishments in Australia
1948 disestablishments in Australia
Darlington
Darlington
Town halls in Sydney
Darlington, New South Wales